Pepa Doncel is a 1969 Spanish romantic drama film directed by Luis Lucia and starring Aurora Bautista, Juan Luis Galiardo and Mercedes Vecino, based in a play by Nobel Prize in Literature Jacinto Benavente.

Cast
 Aurora Bautista as Elisa Medina Fernández 'Pepa Doncel'  
 Juan Luis Galiardo as Gonzalo Carvajal Sastre  
 Mercedes Vecino as La Tira  
 Amalia de Isaura  
 Maribel Martín as Genoveva 'Veva'  
 Carlos Ballesteros 
 Fernando Guillén
 Julio Goróstegui
 Ángel Menéndez 
 Emilio Alonso 
 Antonio Casas 
 María Asquerino
 Gracita Morales as Trini 'La Amoníaco'

References

Bibliography
 Mira, Alberto. The A to Z of Spanish Cinema. Rowman & Littlefield, 2010.

External links 

1969 films
Spanish romantic drama films
1969 romantic drama films
1960s Spanish-language films
Films directed by Luis Lucia
1960s Spanish films